The Sete Passagens State Park is a state park in the state of Bahia, Brazil.
It protects a mountainous region in the transition between Atlantic Forest and Caatinga.

Location

It is in the Chapada Norte region of the state,  from Salvador, the state capital.
It is in the Itapicuru River basin.
It is an important source of water in a drought-prone area, with numerous springs that supply streams to contribute to the Itapicuru-Mirim River, a major tributary of the Itapicuru.
The park covers the Campo Limpo, Sapucaia and Jaqueira ranges to the south of the Jacobina range.
The park contains dozens of greens hills cut by valleys.
There are prehistoric rock paintings in a small grotto at the top of the mountain.

History

The Sete Passagens State Park was created by state decree 7.808 of 24 May 2000.

Environment

The Sete Passagens State Park holds areas of great importance for conservation.
It has diverse flora and fauna, with several endangered species.
Vegetation includes seasonal forest in the transition from Atlantic Forest to Caatinga, and rocky fields at high altitudes.
Mammals include howler monkeys, Coimbra Filho's titi (Callicebus coimbrai), coatis, southern tamandua (Tamandua tetradactyla), tayra (Eira barbara)  and the endangered golden-bellied capuchin (Sapajus xanthosternos).
Birds include hawks, hummingbirds, tinamous, common quail (Coturnix coturnix), seriemas and neotropical bellbirds.

There are more than a dozen waterfalls surrounded by untouched forest.
These include the Jajai, "S" Verde, Espirro, Coração, Sinvaldo, Bico do Urubu, Encontro das Águas, Cadeiras da Natureza, Tucano and Portal falls.
There are access trails to the waterfalls and to belvederes that provide lookouts over the park and its landscape of mountains and valleys.

There are no conflicts over land ownership and the park's staff is effective in monitoring the area, so it does not suffer from problems such as hunting, deforestation and agriculture.
However, farm owners pursue these activities in the immediate surroundings, and there is a constant threat of illegal mining, particularly of gold, around and within the park.

Notes

Sources

State parks of Brazil
Protected areas established in 2000
2000 establishments in Brazil
Protected areas of Bahia